Like many other languages, English has wide variation in pronunciation, both historically and from dialect to dialect. In general, however, the regional dialects of English share a largely similar (but not identical) phonological system. Among other things, most dialects have vowel reduction in unstressed syllables and a complex set of phonological features that distinguish fortis and lenis consonants (stops, affricates, and fricatives).

This article describes the development of the phonology of English over time, starting from its roots in proto-Germanic to diverse changes in different dialects of modern English.

Abbreviations
In the following description, abbreviations are used as follows:

Changes by time period
This section summarizes the changes occurring within distinct time periods, covering the last 2,000 years or so. Within each subsection, changes are in approximate chronological order.

The time periods for some of the early stages are quite short due to the extensive population movements occurring during the Migration Period (early AD), which resulted in rapid dialect fragmentation.

Late Proto-Germanic period

This period includes changes in late Proto-Germanic, up to about the 1st century. Only a general overview of the more important changes is given here; for a full list, see the Proto-Germanic article.

Early   > late PGmc  "you carried (sg)".
 [[Proto-Germanic language#Word-final /m/ > /n/|Word-final  became ]].
 Word-final  was then lost after unstressed syllables with nasalization of the preceding vowel. Hence  * > early PGmc  > late PGmc  > Old English  "day (acc. sg.)". The nasalisation was retained at least into the earliest history of Old English.
 Word-final  was lost after an unstressed syllable. This followed the loss of word-final , because it remained before : PrePGmc * > early PGmc  > late PGmc  "they carried".
 This occurred before deletion of word-final ; hence  * > early PGmc  > late PGmc  > German  "over". Compare PIE * > early PGmc  > late PGmc  > German  "over".
 But it occurred after the raising of unstressed  to : PIE * > PGmc  >  "you carry (pl)".
 This also affected the diphthong , which became .
 As a consequence of this change,  > . The Elder Futhark of the Proto-Norse language still contained different symbols for the two sounds.
 z-umlaut:  is raised to  before .
 Early PGmc  "me, dative" > late PGmc  > Old High German mir, Old Saxon mi, Old Norse mér (with general lowering and lengthening of i before r).
 This change was only sporadic at best because there were barely any words in which it could have occurred at all, since  remained only in stressed syllables. The umlauting effect of  remained, however, and in Old West Norse it was extended to other vowels as well. Hence OEN glaʀ, hrauʀ, OWN gler, hreyrr.
 Pre-nasal raising:  >  before nasal + consonant. Pre-PGmc * > PGmc  >  > OE bindan > ModE bind (Latin ).
 This was later extended in Pre-Old English times to vowels before all nasals; hence Old English niman "take" but Old High German neman.
 Loss of  before , with nasalization and compensatory lengthening of the preceding vowel.
 The nasalization was eventually lost, but remained through the Ingvaeonic period.
 Hence Pre-PGmc * > PGmc  > OE þencan > ModE think, but PrePG * > PGmc  >  > OE  > ModE thought.
 This change followed the raising of  before a nasal: PGmc  >  >  > Gothic .
 Final-syllable short vowels were generally deleted in words of three syllables or more. PGmc  > Goth   "(he) carries" (see above), and also PGmc ,  >  (dative and instrumental plural ending of nouns, 1st person plural ending of verbs, as on the Stentoften Runestone).

Northwest Germanic period
This was the period that existed after the East Germanic languages had split off. Changes during this time were shared with the North Germanic dialects, i.e. Proto-Norse. Many of the changes that occurred were areal, and took time to propagate throughout a dialect continuum that was already diversifying. Thus, the ordering of the changes is sometimes ambiguous, and can differ between dialects.

 In this initial stage, the mutated vowels were still allophonically conditioned, and were not yet distinct as phonemes.
 i-mutation affected all the Germanic languages except for Gothic, although with a great deal of variation. It appears to have occurred earliest, and to be most pronounced, in the Schleswig-Holstein area (the home of the Anglo-Saxons), and from there to have spread north and south. However, it is possible that this change already occurred in Proto-Germanic proper, in which case the phenomenon would have remained merely allophonic for quite some time. If that is the case, that would be the stage reflected in Gothic, where there is no orthographic evidence of i-mutation at all.
 Long vowels and diphthongs were affected only later, probably analogically, and not in all areas. Notably, they were not mutated in most (western) Dutch dialects, whereas short vowels were.
 a-mutation:  is lowered to  when a non-high vowel follows in the next syllable.
Hence PG  > OE/ModE gold, but PG  > OE gyldan > ModE gild.
 This produces a new phoneme , due to inconsistent application and later loss of word-final vowels.
 Final-syllable long vowels were shortened.
PG  ("saw (tool)") > OE sagu, ON sǫg.
 Final  becomes  in ON (later raised to ),  in West Germanic. PG  ("he/she/it healed") > ON heilði, but OE hǣlde, OHG heilta.
PG  ("gift", dative singular) > NWG  > ON gjǫf, OHG gebu, OE giefe (an apparent irregular development).
 "Overlong" vowels were shortened to regular long vowels.
 PG  (maybe already  by late PG) becomes . This preceded final shortening in West Germanic, but postdated it in North Germanic.
 Unstressed diphthongs were monophthongized.  > ,  > . The latter merged with ō from shortened overlong ô. PG  ("son", genitive singular) > NWG  > ON sonar, OE suna, OHG suno; PG  ("he/she/it take", subjunctive) > NWG  > ON nemi, OE nime, OHG neme; PG  ("stone", dative singular) > NWG  > ON steini, OE , OHG steine.

West Germanic period
This period occurred around the 2nd to 4th centuries. It is unclear if there was ever a distinct "Proto-West Germanic", as most changes in this period were areal, and likely spread throughout a dialect continuum that was already diversifying further. Thus, this "period" may not have been a real timespan, but may simply cover certain areal changes that did not reach into North Germanic. This period ends with the further diversification of West Germanic into several groups before and during the Migration Period: Ingvaeonic, Istvaeonic (Old Frankish) and Irminonic (Upper German).

 Loss of word-final .
 This change occurred before rhotacization, as original word-final  was not lost.
  was not lost in single-syllable words in southern and central German. Compare PG  > OS mi, OE me vs. OHG mir.
 The OE nominative plural  (ME ), OS nominative plural  may be from original accusative plural , due to the Ingvaeonic Nasal-Spirant law, rather than original nominative plural , which would be expected to become *-a (OHG -a, compare ON ).
 Rhotacization:  > .
( is normally assumed to be a rhotic fricative in this language, but there is no actual evidence of this.)
 PG  > Goth ; OE dēor > ModE deer
 West Germanic gemination: single consonants followed by  except  became double (geminate). This only affected consonants preceded by a short vowel, because those preceded by a long vowel or by another consonant were never followed by  due to Sievers' law.
 PG  > OE biddan, habban > ModE bid, have

Ingvaeonic and Anglo-Frisian period
This period is estimated to have lasted only a century or so, the 4th to 5th; the time during which the Franks started to spread south into Gaul (France) and the various coastal people began colonising Britain. Changes in this period affected the Ingvaeonic languages, but not the more southerly Central and Upper German languages. The Ingvaeonic group was probably never homogeneous, but was divided further into Old Saxon and Anglo-Frisian. Old Frankish (and later Old Dutch) was not in the core group, but was affected by the spread of several areal changes from the Ingvaeonic area.

The Anglo-Frisian languages shared several unique changes that were not found in the other West Germanic languages. The migration to Britain caused a further split into early Old English and early Old Frisian.

 Ingvaeonic nasal spirant law: Loss of nasals before fricatives, with nasalization and compensatory lengthening of the preceding vowel. Hence PG  became ModG Mund but in Ingvaeonic dialects first became . Old English then denasalised the vowels, giving OE  > ModE "mouth".
 Following this  > . PrePG * > PG  >  >  > OE  > ModE "tooth". (ModG Zahn < OHG zant.) This also applied to  arising earlier in Proto-Germanic: PG  > Late PG  > OE  > ModE "(I) thought".
 Anglo-Frisian brightening:
Hence OE dæġ  "day", plural dagas  "days" (dialectal ModE "dawes"; compare ModE "dawn" < OE dagung ).
 This does not affect nasal . And since this is a back vowel,  in a preceding syllable was prevented from being fronted as well. This created an alternation between the infinitive in *-aną and strong past participle in *-ana (< PG *anaz), where the former became -an in OE but the latter became *-ænæ > -en.
 No attested West Germanic languages show any reflexes of these vowels.

Old English period

This period is estimated to be c. AD 475–900. This includes changes from the split between Old English and Old Frisian (c. AD 475) up through historic early West Saxon of AD 900:

 Breaking of front vowels.
 Most generally, before , and  + consonant (assumed to be velarized  in these circumstances), but exact conditioning factors vary from vowel to vowel.
 Written ea, eo, io, where length is not distinguished graphically.
 Result in some dialects, for example Anglian, was back vowels rather than diphthongs. West Saxon ceald; but Anglian cald > ModE cold.
 Diphthong height harmonization: The height of one element of each diphthong is adjusted to match that of the other.
  >  through this change, possibly through an intermediate stage . PG  > OE  > ModE stone.
PG  > OE  "joy" (cf. ModE dream, ModG Traum). PG  > OE  > ModE death (Goth , ModG Tod). PG  > OE  > ModE eye (Goth , ModG Auge).
 A-restoration: Short  is backed to  when a back vowel follows in the next syllable.
 This produces alternations such as OE dæġ "day", pl. dagas (cf. dialectal dawes "days").
A similar palatalization happened in Frisian, but by this point the languages had split up; the Old English palatalization must be ordered after Old-English-specific changes such as a-restoration.
(At this point, there was no word-initial .)
  is palatalized in almost all circumstances. PG  > ModE ship (cf. skipper < Dutch schipper, where no such change happened), but West Frisian skip. PG  > OE scyrte > ModE shirt, but > ON skyrt > ModE skirt. An example of retained  is PG  > OE ascian > ModE ask; there is evidence that OE ascian was sometimes rendered metathetized to acsian, which is the presumed origin of ModE ask.
 Similar changes of o > eo, u > eo are generally recognized to be merely a spelling convention. Hence WG  > OE geong  > ModE "young"; if geong literally indicated an  diphthong, the modern result would be *yeng.
 It is disputed whether there is Middle English evidence of the reality of this change in Old English.
 i-mutation: The most important change in the Old English period.
  >  (but  >  before  or );
  >  > ;
  > ;
 ,  >  > ; this also applied to the equivalent short diphthongs.
 Short  >  by an earlier pan-Germanic change under the same circumstances; often conflated with this change.
 This had dramatic effects in inflectional and derivational morphology, e.g. in noun paradigms (fōt "foot", pl. fēt "feet"); verb paradigms (bacan "to bake", bæcþ "he bakes"); nominal derivatives from adjectives (strang "strong", strengþ(u) "strength"), from verbs (cuman "to come", cyme "coming"), and from other nouns (fox "fox", fyxenn "vixen"); verbal derivatives (fōda "food", fēdan "to feed"); comparative adjectives (eald "old", ieldra "older, elder"). Many echoes of i-mutation are still present in the modern language.
For example, PIE * > PG  > OE sunu "son (nom. sing.)", PIE * > PG  > OE feohu "cattle (nom. sing.)", PIE * > PG  > OE ƿine "friend (nom. sing.)", but PrePG * > PG  > WG  > OE  "foot (nom. pl.)".
 A similar change happened in the other West Germanic languages, although after the earliest records of those languages.
 This did not affect the new  (< ) formed from palatalisation of PG , suggesting that it was still a palatal fricative at the time of the change. For example, PG  > early OE * > OE ƿrēġan.
The preceding vowel is lengthened. 
 This leads to alternations such as eoh "horse", pl. ēos, and ƿealh "foreigner", pl. ƿēalas.
 Vowel assimilation: Two vowels in hiatus merge into a long vowel.
 Some examples come from h-loss. PG frijōndz > OE frīond > frēond "friend"; PG saiwimiz "sea (dat. pl.)" > *sǣƿum > OE sǣm.
 Back mutation: Short e, i and (in Mercian only) a are sometimes broken to short eo, io, and ea when a back vowel follows in the next syllable.
 Hence seofon "seven" < PG *sebun, mioluc, meoluc "milk" < PG *meluks.
 Palatal umlaut: Short e, eo, io become i (occasionally ie) before hs, ht.
 Hence riht "right" (cf. German recht), siex "six" (cf. German sechs).
 Vowel reductions in unstressed syllables:
  became  in final syllables, but usually appears as o in medial syllables (although a and u both appear).
  normally became  in a final syllable except when absolutely word-final.
This occurred within the literary period.
 Some Old English dialects retained the rounded vowels, however.
 Early pre-cluster shortening: Vowels were shortened when falling immediately before either three consonances or the combination of two consonants and two additional syllables in the word.
 Thus, OE gāst > ModE ghost, but OE găstliċ > ModE ghastly (ā > ă) and OE crīst > ModE Christ, but OE crĭstesmæsse > ModE Christmas (ī > ĭ).
 Probably occurred in the seventh century as evidenced by eighth century Anglo-Saxon missionaries' translation into Old Low German, "Gospel" as Gotspel, lit. "God news" not expected *Guotspel, "Good news" due to gōdspell > gŏdspell.
 Initial  became  in late Old English. This occurred within the literary period, as evidenced by shifting patterns in alliterative verse.

The Middle English Period

This period is estimated to be c. 900–1400.
 This probably occurred around AD 1000.
 Later on, many of these vowels were shortened again; but evidence from the Ormulum shows that this lengthening was once quite general.
 Remnants persist in the Modern English pronunciations of words such as child (but not children, since a third consonant follows), field (plus yield, wield, shield), old (but not alderman as it is followed by at least two syllables), climb, find (plus mind, kind, bind, etc.), long and strong (but not length and strength), fiend, found (plus hound, bound, etc.).
 Pre-cluster shortening: Vowels were shortened when followed by two or more consonants, except when lengthened as above.
 This occurred in two stages, the first stage occurring already in late Old English and affecting only vowels followed by three or more consonants, or two or more consonants when two syllables followed (an early form of trisyllabic laxing).
 Diphthong smoothing: Inherited height-harmonic diphthongs were monophthongized by the loss of the second component, with the length remaining the same.
 Middle English stressed vowel changes:
  (from Old English ) and  merged into .
 Length distinctions were eliminated in these diphthongs, yielding diphthongs  plus  borrowed from French.
 Mergers of new diphthongs:
 Trisyllabic laxing: Shortening of stressed vowels when two syllables followed.
 This results in pronunciation variants in Modern English such as divine vs divinity and south vs. southern (OE sūðerne).
 Middle English open syllable lengthening: Vowels were usually lengthened in open syllables (13th century), except when trisyllabic laxing would apply.
 Reduction and loss of unstressed vowels: Remaining unstressed vowels merged into .
 Starting around 1400 AD,  is lost in final syllables.
 Voiced fricatives became independent phonemes through borrowing and other sound changes.
  before back vowel becomes ;  becomes .
 Modern English sword, answer, lamb.
  in swore is due to analogy with swear.

Up to Shakespeare's English
This period is estimated to be c. AD 1400–1600.
 H-loss completed:  (written gh) lost in most dialects, so that e.g. taught and taut become homophones, likewise bow (meaning "bend") and bough.
  and  when not followed by a vowel undergo mutations:
After this, the combinations  and  lose their  in most accents, affecting words like talk, caulk, and folk. Words acquired after this change (such as talc) were not affected.
 Before ,  become , as in alms, balm, calm, palm; Holmes.
 Some words have irregular pronunciations, e.g. from non-standard dialects (salmon) or spelling pronunciations (falcon in American English).
 Short  develop into lax 
 Great Vowel Shift; all long vowels raised or diphthongized.
  become , respectively.
  become , respectively.
 New  developed from old  (see below).
 Thus,  effectively rotated in-place.
 Initial cluster reductions:
  merges into ; hence rap and wrap become homophones.
 Doubled consonants reduced to single consonants.
 Loss of most remaining diphthongs.
 The above two mergers did not occur in many regional dialects as late as the 20th century (e.g. Northern England, East Anglia, South Wales, and even Newfoundland).
 This  would become  in standard varieties of English, and later still  in some cases through "Yod-dropping".
  remains in Welsh English and some other non-standard varieties.
  and  merge to // (today ), the only Middle English diphthong that remains in the modern standard English varieties.

Up to the American–British split

This period is estimated to be c. AD 1600–1725.
 At some preceding time after Old English, all  become .
 Evidence from Old English shows that, at that point, the pronunciation  occurred only before a consonant.
 Scottish English has  consistently.
/p t k/ develop aspirated allophones /pʰ tʰ kʰ/ when they occur alone at the beginning of stressed syllables.
 Initial cluster reductions:
  both merge into ; hence gnat and Nat become homophones; likewise not and knot.
 The foot–strut split: In southern England,  becomes unrounded and eventually lowered unless preceded by a labial and followed by a non-velar. This gives put   but cut  and buck .
 In some words,  coalesce to produce , and the new phoneme , a sound change known as yod-coalescence, a type of palatalization: nature, mission, procedure, vision.
 These combinations mostly occurred in borrowings from French and Latin.
 This sound mutation still occurs allophonically in Modern English: did you  →  didjou. 
 /ɔ/ as in lot, top, and fox, is lowered towards /ɒ/.
 Long vowels , from ME , inconsistently shortened, especially before : sweat, head, bread, breath, death, leather, weather
 The Meet–meat merger  /eː/ (ea) raises to /iː/ (ee) Thus Meet and meat become homophones in most accents. Words with (ea) that were shortened (see above) avoided the merger, also some words like steak and great simply remained with an /eː/ (which later becomes /eɪ/ in most varieties) merging with words like name, so now death, great, and meat have three different vowels.
  (the last of these often deriving from earlier  before , as in worm and "word") merge before , so all varieties of ModE except for some Scottish English and some Irish English have the same vowel in fern, fir and fur.
 Also affects vowels in derived forms, so that starry no longer rhymes with marry.
In certain other words it becomes , for example father .  is actually a new phoneme deriving from this and words like calm (see above).
 Most varieties of northern English English, Welsh English and Scottish English retain  in cat, trap etc.
 The lot–cloth split: in some varieties, lengthening of  before voiced velars (American English only) and voiceless fricatives.
  becomes  in many words spelt oo: for example, book, wool, good, foot. This is partially resisted in the northern and western variants of English English, where words ending in -ook might still use .

After American–British split, up to World War II

This period is estimated to be c. AD 1725–1945.
 Split into rhotic and non-rhotic accents: syllable-final  is lost in the English of England.
 The loss of coda  causes significant changes to preceding vowels:
  merges with 
  become 
  (phonetically ) become long vowels, .
 All other short vowels plus coda  merge as a new phoneme, the long mid-central vowel .
 Long vowels before intervocalic  are also diphthongised, thus dairy  from earlier .
 The Southern Hemisphere varieties of English (Australian, New Zealand, and South African) are also non-rhotic.
 Non-rhotic accents of North American English include New York City, Boston, and older Southern.
 Unrounding of :  as in lot and bother is unrounded in Norwich, the West Country, in Hiberno-English and most of North American English
 The Boston accent is an exception where the  vowel is still rounded.
 Out of North American dialects that have unrounded , the only notable exception is New York City.
 All six words rhyme in most American, Scottish English and Northern England English.
 The long vowels  from the Great Vowel Shift become diphthongs  in many varieties of English, though not in Scottish and Northern England English.
 Generally, between vowels or the syllabic consonants , when the following syllable is completely unstressed: butter, bottle, bottom .
 But  and  before syllabic  is pronounced as a glottal stop, so cotton .
 Happy-tensing (the term is from Wells 1982): final lax  becomes tense  in words like happ. Absent from some dialects like Southern American English, Traditional RP, cultivated South African English and to some degree Scottish English.
 H-dropping begins in England and Welsh English, but this does not affect the upper-class southern accent that developed into Received Pronunciation, nor does it affect the far north of England or East Anglia.

After World War II
Some of these changes are in progress.
 Restoration of post-vocalic  in some non-rhotic accents of Southern American English
 Changes to the low front vowel 
Some linguistics research suggests that /æ/ raising existed since the American colonial era, due to relic evidence of this feature in some of the Northern and Midland U.S.
Horse-hoarse merger /ɔr/ and /or/ merge in many varieties of English
Vowel mergers before intervocalic /r/ in most of North America (resistance occurs mainly on the east coast): 
 Mary–marry–merry merger: /eɪr/ and /ær/ merge to /ɛr/.
 Hurry-furry merger: /ʌr/ and /ɜr/ merge to /ɚ/.
 Mirror-nearer merger /ɪr/ and /ir/ merge or are very similar, the merged vowel can be quite variable.
 Fronting of back vowels:
 Resistance occurs in Northern American English and New York City English.
 Resistance occurs in Northern American English and New York City English.
 In many varieties /ʌ/ is fronted to [ʌ̟], [ɜ], or [ɐ].
 T-glottalization becomes increasingly widespread in Great Britain.
 Various treatments of the th sounds, the dental fricatives :
 Th-fronting: merger with the labiodental fricatives 
 Th-stopping: shift to dental stops , or merger with alveolar stops 
 Th-debuccalization: lenition to 
 Th-alveolarization: merger with alveolar fricatives 
This occurs in Estuary English and other dialects.
Though it occurs in some environments in many British English dialects, it is most extensive in American and (in younger speakers) Canadian English.
 Northern Cities Vowel Shift in Inland Northern American English:
 lowering of 
backing and lowering of 
 backing of 
 lowering and backing of 
 Changes to centering diphthongs in non-rhotic varieties of English (England and Australia):
  smooth to : near, square, start, north.
This sound change is still in progress.

 Examples of sound changes 
The following table shows a possible sequence of changes for some basic vocabulary items, leading from Proto-Indo-European (PIE) to Modern English. The notation ">!" indicates an unexpected change, whereas the simple notation ">" indicates an expected change. An empty cell means no change at the given stage for the given item. Only sound changes that had an effect on one or more of the vocabulary items are shown.

NOTE: Some of the changes listed above as "unexpected" are more predictable than others.  For example:
Some changes are morphological ones that move a word from a rare declension to a more common one, and hence are not so surprising: e.g. * "three" >! * (adding the common West Germanic feminine ending -u) and  "heart" (stem ) >!  (change from consonant stem to n-stem).
Some changes are assimilations that are unexpected but of a cross-linguistically common type, e.g.  "four" >!  where ** would be expected by normal sound change. Assimilations involving adjacent numbers are especially common, e.g.  "four" >!  by assimilation to  "five" (in addition,  is a cross-linguistically common sound change in general).
On the other extreme, the Early Modern English change of  "one" >!  is almost completely mysterious.  Note that the related words alone ( < all + one) and only ( < one + -ly) did not change.

Summary of vowel developments

Development of Middle English vowels

Monophthongs
This table describes the main historical developments of English vowels in the last 1000 years, beginning with late Old English and focusing on the Middle English and Modern English changes leading to the current forms. It provides a lot of detail about the changes taking place in the last 600 years (since Middle English), while omitting any detail in the Old English and earlier periods. For more detail about the changes in the first millennium AD, see the section on the development of Old English vowels.

This table omits the history of Middle English diphthongs; see that link for a table summarizing the developments.

The table is organized around the pronunciation of Late Middle English c. 1400 AD (the time of Chaucer) and the modern spelling system, which dates from the same time and closely approximates the pronunciation of the time. Modern English spelling originates in the spelling conventions of Middle English scribes and its modern form was largely determined by William Caxton, the first English printer (beginning in 1476).

As an example, the vowel spelled  corresponds to two Middle English pronunciations:  in most circumstances, but long  in an open syllable, i.e. followed by a single consonant and then a vowel, notated aCV in the spelling column. (This discussion ignores the effect of trisyllabic laxing.) The lengthened variant is due to the Early Middle English process of open-syllable lengthening; this is indicated by (leng.). Prior to that time, both vowels were pronounced the same, as a short vowel ; this is reflected by the fact that there is a single merged field corresponding to both Middle English sounds in the Late Old English column (the first column). However, this earlier Middle English vowel  is itself the merger of a number of different Anglian Old English sounds:
 occasionally, the long vowel  when directly followed by two consonants, particularly when this vowel corresponded to West Saxon Old English . (Middle English, and hence Modern English, largely derives from the Anglian dialect of Old English, but some words are derived from the West Saxon dialect of Old English, because the border between the two dialects ran through the London area. The West Saxon dialect, not the Anglian dialect, is the "standard" dialect described in typical reference works on Old English.)
However, each vowel has split into a number of different pronunciations in Modern English, depending on the phonological context. The short , for example, has split into seven different vowels, all still spelled  but pronounced differently:
  when not in any of the contexts indicated below, as in man, sack, wax, etc.
(General American is the standard pronunciation in the U.S. and Received Pronunciation is the most prestigious pronunciation in Britain. In both cases, these are the pronunciations typically found in news broadcasts and among the middle and upper classes.)
  when followed by an  plus either a consonant or the end of a word, as in small, walk, etc. (In the case of walk, talk, chalk, etc. the  has dropped out, but this is not indicated here. Nor are words like male covered, which had long  in Middle English.)
(The  has dropped out in pronunciation.)
 In RP only, the pronunciation  is often found when followed by an unvoiced fricative, i.e. This does not apply to GA and also unpredictably does not affect a number of words of the same form, e.g. crass, math, etc.

Diphthongs
This table describes the main developments of Middle English diphthongs, starting with the Old English sound sequences that produced them (sequences of vowels and g, h or ƿ'') and ending with their Modern English equivalents. Many special cases have been ignored.

Development of Old English vowels

See also
 English language
 History of the English language
 English phonology
 Phonological history of English consonants
 Phonological history of English consonant clusters
 Phonological history of English vowels
 Phonological history of English short A
 Phonological history of English low back vowels
 Phonological history of English high back vowels
 Phonological history of English high front vowels
 English-language vowel changes before historic /r/
 English-language vowel changes before historic /l/
 Scottish vowel length rule
 Phonological history of Scots

Notes

References
 .
 .
 .
 .
 .
 .
 .
 .
 .
 .
 .
 .

History of the English language
English phonology
Splits and mergers in English phonology